Parvaresh (Persian: Education) was one of the Persian publications which were published in Cairo, Egypt. The paper was in circulation between 1900 and 1902. It was among the Persian publications published abroad which contributed to the political awakening of Iranians.

History and profile
Parvaresh was established by Mirza Ali Mohammad Khan Kashani in Cairo in 1900, and the first issue appeared in June that year. He first launched another Persian newspaper in Cairo entitled Sorayya. However, when he disputed with Sorayya'''s another editor Farajallah Hosayni Kashani he left it and started Parvaresh which was also published on a weekly basis like Sorayya. Parvaresh folded in November 1902 when its founder Mirza Ali Mohammad Khan Kashani died.

Political stance and contentParvaresh'' was highly progressive and frequently featured articles about women in the Iranian society. The paper argued that there were many talented and creative Iranian women particularly in the field of literature. It was also added that the status of Iranian women under the Qajar rule was not acceptable due to the fact that they were considered to be lack of human attributes.

References

1900 establishments in Egypt
1902 disestablishments in Egypt
Defunct newspapers published in Egypt
Defunct weekly newspapers
Egypt–Iran relations
Newspapers published in Cairo
Persian-language newspapers
Newspapers established in 1900
Publications disestablished in 1902
Non-Arabic-language newspapers published in Egypt
Weekly newspapers published in Egypt